Alabama v. Shelton, 535 U.S. 654 (2002), was a United States Supreme Court case in which the Court upheld the Alabama Supreme Court's ruling that counsel (a lawyer) must be provided for the accused in order to impose a suspended prison sentence.

Background 
Shelton was accused of third-degree  assault, which, in Alabama, is a misdemeanor and carries a maximum sentence of one year in prison and a $2,000 fine. The court repeatedly warned Shelton of the dangers of representing himself during the trial, yet failed to offer him counsel. He represented himself both in the local court, where he was convicted, and the Alabama Circuit Court, where he was also convicted. However, the Circuit Court gave Shelton a 30-day suspended sentence and 2 years' probation.

The Criminal Court of Appeals found that it was not compulsory to offer the defendant counsel for a suspended sentence because the sentence did not result in actual confinement.

The Supreme Court of Alabama stated that: (1) a defendant may not be sentenced to a term of imprisonment absent provision of counsel; and (2) for purposes of this rule, a suspended sentence constitutes a "term of imprisonment," even though incarceration is not immediate or inevitable.

Opinion of the Court 
The United States Supreme Court affirmed the Supreme Court of Alabama's decision.

See also

Further reading

External links
 

United States Supreme Court cases
2002 in case law
United States Sixth Amendment appointment of counsel case law
2002 in Alabama
Legal history of Alabama
United States Supreme Court cases of the Rehnquist Court